Scotinotylus antennatus is a species of sheet weaver found in Europe, Kazakhstan and Russia. It was described by O.P.-Cambridge in 1875.

References

Linyphiidae
Spiders of Europe
Spiders of Asia
Spiders described in 1875